Mallarpur is a census town in Mayureswar I CD Block in Rampurhat subdivision of Birbhum district in the Indian state of West Bengal.

Etymology
The name Mallarpur had come from Malla kings. Probably, it has some connection with the great Malla king Veer Hambir.

Geography

Location
Four separate villages called Amba, Fatehpur, Bahina and Mallarpur merged to form a small town Mallarpur.

A glimpse of the past
As one drives to Mallarpur, off the now busy highway, one will see a grand old ruin dominating the landscape for miles around. This is the Kacheri Baari or the Court House. Built in the late 18th century, this building must have been stunning in its heydays. As one enters through a once grand, but now rusted, metal gate, one comes into the front lawn, about 50 yards long. At the end of it, like a giant spider, sits the Kacheri Baari, a haunted house.

There is a "Vanavasi Kalyan Ashram Hostel" near Amba at Mollarpur beside Ramkrishna Ashram.

There is the burial place (samadhi) of Krishnananda Agamavagisha, at Molleswar Shiva temple ground. Krishnananda Agamavagisha was the great tantrik and author of "Brihat Tantrasara" and inventor of Dakshina Kali idol, and guru of Ramprasad Sen.

Note: The map alongside presents some of the notable locations in the area. All places marked in the map are linked in the larger full screen map.

Police station
There is a police station at Mallarpur.

CD block HQ
The headquarters of Mayureswar I CD block are located at Mallarpur.

Demographics
As per the 2011 Census of India, Mallarpur had a total population of 6,471 of which 3,310 (51%) were males and 3,161 (49%) were females. Population below 6 years was 735. The total number of literates in Mallarpur was 4,584 (79.92% of the population over 6 years).

Transport

Mallarpur is a station on the Sahibganj Loop.

As the Panagarh–Morgram Highway passes through the town the road communication is well developed along with the railway communication. NH 14 (old numbering NH 60) is passing through Mallarpur to District Headquarter Suri via Ganpur, Deucha.

Education and Training
Mallarpur High School, Mollarpur Dharani Deben Siksha Niketan and Mollarpur Girl's High School are well known schools at Mollarpur. Turku Hansda-Lapsa Hemram Mahavidyalaya is situated near Mallarpur (on NH 14 at Madian).
 
There are various private and Government collaborated schools, institutes and organisations which are implementing people education and training.

Culture
David J. McCutchion mentions the many small char chala temples of the 18th and 19th centuries built of brick with facades richly carved, at Mallarpur.

People of Mallarpur celebrate all festival with same zeal. The main festivals are Eid, Durga puja, Kalipuja, Chhath, etc. Chhathpuja is celebrated by the Bihari community at Kali Tala in Bahina village and Eid is celebrated by Muslims at Mallarpur Muslim Para.

Poush Sankranti fair is held at Shibpur in the Mayureswar police station area. Shivratri fair is held at Dabuk. Gosaidas fair is held at Dakshingram.

Shivaratri and Gajan are held at Malleswar Shiva temple at gram Mallarpur. Phulkhela (literally play with flowers) is held during Charak Puja at Malleswar. At this phulkhela, bhaktas walk on burning wood.

Dharma pujo fair is held at Ratma on the occasion of Buddha Purnima.

On Shivaratri a grand fair is held at local Nimitala ground beside NH 14.

Ratha Yatra is one of the greatest festivals of Mallarpur.

Healthcare
Mallarpur Rural Hospital at Mallarpur, with 30 beds, is the main government medical facility in Mayureswar I CD block.

Gallery

References

Villages in Birbhum district